Mazuca amoena is a moth in the family Noctuidae. It can be found from the Democratic Republic of the Congo to Zimbabwe, with one instance in South Africa.

Appearance 
M. amoena is a white moth with black stripes along the border of the wing, a few red stripes along the mid-top, an orange circle along the ends of the wings, and smaller black circles towards the center.

Taxonomy 
M. amoena was named by Karl Jordan in 1933.

References

Hadeninae
Moths described in 1933